Task Force Trailblazer is a United States Department of Defense Task force which provides aviation support to ground commanders throughout the Middle East.

Structure
 18.1 = 449th Combat Aviation Brigade
 18.2 = 35th Combat Aviation Brigade
 HHC
 935th Aviation Support Battalion
 1st Assault Helicopter Battalion, 108th Aviation Regiment (1-108 AHB)
 2d General Support Assault Battalion, 211th Aviation Regiment (2-211 GSAB)
 4th Attack Reconnaissance Battalion, 4th Aviation Regiment (4-4 ARB)
 1st Attack Reconnaissance Battalion, 1st Aviation Regiment (1-1 ARB)
 F Company, 1st Battalion, 227th Aviation Regiment (1-227 AVN)
 D Company, 10th Aviation Regiment (D-10 AVN)

References

Ad hoc units and formations of the United States Army
Operation Inherent Resolve